Anne Frank: The Whole Story is a 2001 two-part biographical war drama television miniseries based on the 1998 book Anne Frank: The Biography by Melissa Müller. The television miniseries aired on ABC on May 20 and 21, 2001. The television miniseries starred Ben Kingsley, Brenda Blethyn, Hannah Taylor-Gordon and Lili Taylor. Controversially, but in keeping with the claim made by Melissa Müller, the television miniseries asserts that the anonymous betrayer of the Frank family was the office cleaner, when in fact the betrayer's identity has never been established. A disagreement between the producers of the television miniseries and the Anne Frank Foundation about the validity of this and other details led to the withdrawal of their endorsement of the dramatization, which prevented the use of any quotations from the writings of Anne Frank appearing within the television miniseries. Both Ben Kingsley and Hannah Taylor-Gordon received Golden Globe and Emmy Award nominations for their performances as Anne Frank and Otto Frank, respectively.

Plot overview 
In 1939, Anne Frank (:Hannah Taylor-Gordon) realizes her world is beginning to change around her. Eventually, the Nazis invade the Netherlands. Anne becomes increasingly distressed as her rights are taken away, and her family is ominously being forced to register as Jews with the government and to wear yellow stars. She is then forced to leave her school and attend a Jewish lyceum, where she meets her new best friend, :Jacqueline van Maarsen (Victoria Anne Brown), who is only half-Jewish. Anne also meets Hello Silberberg (Nicky Cantor), on whom she develops a crush; it is implied that Hello also reciprocates her feelings. On her 13th birthday, she receives the famous checkered-patterned diary and immediately goes to her room to write her first entry.

A few weeks later, on a normal Sunday in July 1942, Margot (:Jessica Manley), Anne's sister, receives a call-up from the :Germans to be deported to a "labor camp" in the :East. :Otto Frank (Ben Kingsley) moves his family into the now-renowned "Secret Annex", followed soon by Hermann and Auguste van Pels (:Joachim Krol and :Brenda Blethyn), their son Peter (:Nicholas Audsley), and Fritz Pfeffer (:Jan Niklas), the Frank family's :dentist.  During their stay in the annex, the Van Pels family members are noted for their constant bickering. Fritz becomes Anne's antagonist, and Anne has her first serious relationship with Peter, from whom she receives her first kiss.  All the while, she wishes for an end to the war. Anne also gets her first period while in the annex - an occasion that she had been anxiously awaiting. One night a thief breaks into the building below the annex, leaving the eight refugees in terror.

Eventually, on August 4, 1944, the Franks are denounced by Lena Hartog (Veronica Nowag-Jones), the cleaning lady of the :business in which the annex resides. The eight people in the hiding are arrested and Anne's diary is dumped onto the floor while SS man Karl Silberbauer (Holger Daemgen) searches for hoarded money. Two of the helpers (of those in the Secret Annex) are also arrested. In conversation with Otto, Silberbauer is stunned to learn that he served as an officer in the Imperial German Army during World War I. Silberbauer laments that, if they had not gone into hiding, Otto and his family would have received decent treatment.

Afterwards, the Franks are sent on a train to Westerbork, a transit camp, where Anne, her family and friends are held in the criminal "S Barracks". There, Anne meets a woman, Janny Brandes-Brilleslijper (Klára Issová) and her sister Lientje (Zdeňka Volencová), who are later seen with Anne in Bergen-Belsen. Anne also befriends the camp's schoolteacher (Jaroslava Siktancova), who often invites Anne to the camp school to tell the students stories. (One of them is Mrs. Quackenbush, a story that Anne had written before going into hiding, and had been assigned to write by her math teacher as punishment for repeatedly talking in class)

Anne and her family are soon transported to Auschwitz, where the women are stripped of their clothing and their hair is shorn. She is separated from her father and the other men. During a selection for women in the camp to go to a safer place to work in a munitions factory, Anne's mother and sister are chosen, but Anne is not. Therefore, Edith and Margot choose to remain behind. Anne and Margot are sent to a scabies barracks and later deported to Bergen-Belsen, which is no more than many large tents on a muddy ground surrounded by an electric fence. Mrs. Van Pels eventually arrives at the camp to find Anne very thin and Margot sick with typhus. One night Anne sees her old friend, Hannah (Jade Williams), through the fence. Hannah is a privileged prisoner and tells Anne that her father is dying but her sister is alive. She throws a package with bread and socks over to Anne.

In the last scene with Anne, a fevered Margot and Anne speak of the days before they went to Bergen-Belsen. They go to sleep. The next morning, Anne opens her eyes, and hears birds outside. She nudges Margot to show her, but Margot doesn't wake up, and instead falls out of bed onto the ground. Anne realizes that Margot is dead, and lifts her eyes to the sky in defeat.

After the war in 1945, it is revealed that Otto is, in fact, alive. He looks for information about his daughters, but has no luck in doing so until he is directed to find Janny Brandes, who survived the camp. Otto is told that Anne died a few days after Margot. Miep Gies (:Lili Taylor), who helped the Franks hide, gives Anne's preserved diary to Otto. Otto reads it all. He then goes up to the now empty annex and photos. He collapses in a crying heap in front of Anne's wall, which is still plastered with movie stars. An epilogue is then shown which describes what happened to everyone mentioned in the story.

Cast

Home media
Anne Frank: The Whole Story was released on VHS and DVD on August 28, 2001, by Buena Vista Home Entertainment. The only difference between the DVD and VHS version of this television miniseries is the trailer of South Pacific on the DVD.

Reception
Anne Frank: The Whole Story earned critical acclaim from critics and viewers. The New York Post called the television miniseries "undeniably powerful". It was nominated for three Golden Globes, and won the Emmy Award for the Best Miniseries and a 2001 Peabody Award.

See also 

 List of Holocaust films
 List of films about Anne Frank
 List of television films produced for American Broadcasting Company

References

External links 
 

2001 American television series debuts
2001 American television series endings
American biographical series
Films about Anne Frank
American Broadcasting Company original programming
2000s American television miniseries
Biographical films about writers
Films based on biographies
Films directed by Robert Dornhelm
Films set in the 1930s
Films set in the 1940s
Peabody Award-winning television programs
Primetime Emmy Award for Outstanding Miniseries winners
Primetime Emmy Award-winning television series
Biographical films about children
Holocaust films
Films scored by Graeme Revell
Films shot in the Czech Republic
Czech television films
Czech war films
Television series about the Holocaust
American World War II films
Czech World War II films
British World War II films
Czech films based on actual events